50th & France is a commercial district located in the area of West 50th Street and France Avenue South in the cities of Edina and Minneapolis in the U.S. state of Minnesota. It includes over 175 retail shops and offices. Shops include various apparel stores, craft stores, jewelers, restaurants, cafes, spas, salons, and multiplex art-house movie theater. In 2007, a mid-rise condominium building, with units going for well over $1 million, was built on the southwest corner of the intersection. Once a year the 50th & France area hosts the Edina Art Fair, which has served as a national showcase for the fine arts since 1966.

External links
 Official Website

Edina, Minnesota
Geography of Hennepin County, Minnesota
Minneapolis–Saint Paul
Streets in Minneapolis